Sheeba were an all-girl pop trio popular in Ireland in the late 1970s and early 1980s. They were Maxi, Marion Fossett and Frances Campbell. They are best known for representing the host nation, Ireland, in the Eurovision Song Contest in 1981 with "Horoscopes".

Career
In 1978, the group took part in the Irish National Song Contest, to select Ireland's entry for that year's Eurovision Song Contest. But they failed to win with their song, "It's Amazing What Love Can Do". They went on to release several singles in Ireland with producer Roberto Danova, although their biggest hit was "Horoscopes", which reached No.3.

Following their exposure in the 1981 contest, they signed a recording contract in the UK and released the singles "The Next Night" and "Mystery", neither of these found success although were performed on UK TV shows such as 'Lena' (BBC2) and 'The UK Disco Dancing Championships' (ITV.)  Exposure on the Eurovision also led to concert tours in Europe and Japan. The following year they entered RTÉ's National Song Contest final again with a song performed in Irish;  ("Thank You"), but were unsuccessful. Later in 1982 they were involved in a road accident in the West of Ireland that brought their career to an eventual halt due to their reluctance to continue touring. The group shared vocal duties with Maggie Moone on the UK ITV series Name That Tune. After a Japanese tour in 1983, they decided to split, but did compete one more time in the National Song Contest in 1984, where they finished fourth with 'My Love and Me ' behind future Eurovision winners Linda Martin and Charlie McGettigan.

Maxi went on to be a successful broadcaster with RTÉ in Dublin hosting both TV and Radio shows for many years including Eurosong 1987 which was won by Johnny Logan ahead of his second Eurovision win; Marion Fossett is ringmistress of the well-known family circus, Fossetts; and Frances Campbell worked as a broadcaster for BBC Radio Foyle in Northern Ireland.

References

Irish pop music groups
Eurovision Song Contest entrants for Ireland
Eurovision Song Contest entrants of 1981